Royal Albert Memorial Museum & Art Gallery (RAMM) is a museum and art gallery in Exeter, Devon, the largest in the city. It holds significant and diverse collections in areas such as zoology, anthropology, fine art, local and overseas archaeology, and geology. Altogether the museum holds over one million objects, of which a small percentage is on permanent public display. It is a 'Major Partner Museum' (MPM) under the Arts Council England administered programme of strategic investment, which means RAMM receives funding (2012–15) to develop its services.  RAMM receives this funding in partnership with Plymouth City Museum & Art Gallery.  Previously they were described as 'hub museums' under the 'Renaissance' Programme for regional museums which operated between 2002–11 and funded by the now defunct Museums Libraries & Archives Council (MLA).

Founded in 1868, the museum is housed in a Gothic Revival building of local New Red Sandstone that has undergone several extensions during its history; most recently, the museum was re-opened on 15 December 2011 after a redevelopment lasting four years and costing £24M. Since its re-opening the museum has received several awards.

History

Establishment and early period
The site for the museum was donated by Richard Sommers Gard, MP for Exeter from 1857 to 1864, and a competition for its design attracted twenty-four entries, including one from John Hayward, whose gothic design was the winner. His original plan called for a tall central tower like that at the Oxford University Museum of Natural History, but that feature was rejected and was replaced by a gable and rose window.

Initially proposed by Sir Stafford Northcote as a practical memorial to Prince Albert, an appeal fund was launched in 1861. John Gendall volunteered to curate an initial collection required to fill the planned building. and the first phases of the building were completed by 1868. RAMM was the birthplace for much of Exeter's cultural life: the university, central library and college of art all had their origins in what became known as RAMM. The 'Devon and Exeter Albert Memorial', as it was originally known, provided an integrated museum, art gallery, free library, reading room, school of art and school of engineering in the manner long advocated by Prince Albert.

Its contents soon outgrew the building, necessitating the construction of extensions in 1894 (by Medley Fulford) and in 1898 (by Tait and Harvey). This second extension, the York Wing, was opened by the Duke and Duchess of York, later King George V and Queen Mary, and at the same time the title of 'Royal' was granted and so from that date the name Royal Albert Memorial Museum was used.  Over the course of time locals adopted the abbreviation 'RAMM', and this in turn became the name by which the museum is branded.

For many years the museum changed little after that construction period, although the city library moved out of RAMM in 1930, the school of science ultimately developed into the University of Exeter and the school of art became what is now the University of Plymouth's Faculty of Art & Education, formerly Exeter College of Art and Design.  Over time RAMM gradually expanded to fill the whole building.

RAMM today
Between 2007–11 a major redevelopment was completed costing £24 million. Designed by architects Allies and Morrison, it included repair to the fabric of the building, refurbishment, a complete redisplay of the collections, an extension and a new entrance from the historic Registered gardens at the rear. The Heritage Lottery Fund contributed nearly £10 million of the cost. In addition a purpose-built off-site collections store called the Ark was built and fitted out. The museum reopened on 15 December 2011.

The museum is open 10am to 5pm every day except Mondays and bank holidays. Entry is free.

Collections
Four major collection areas are represented: antiquities, art, natural history and world cultures.  The world cultures collections are designated as being of national and international significance by the UK government.

The museum's zoology collection includes specimens of invertebrates and mammals from across the world. Percy Sladen's collection of echinoderms is held by the museum and considered the most important of its kind outside of any national collection.

The costume and textiles collection of the museum is considerable; according to the University of Brighton, they "must rank as one of the most important collections outside London". Due to the delicate nature of these materials, the collection is not on permanent display.

RAMM's art collection comprises over 7,000 objects including paintings, drawings, prints and sculpture, representing important British artists and emphasising RAMM's location in the South West.  Significant artists represented in the collection include Gainsborough, Reynolds, Pompeo Batoni, Richard Wilson and Joseph Wright of Derby; Walter Sickert, Barbara Hepworth, John Nash, Edward Burra, David Bomberg and Patrick Heron.

The donors who contributed to the collection include Kent Kingdon (an upholsterer and interior designer), Sir Harry Veitch (owner of the horticultural firm Veitch and Sons) and John Lane (founder of the publishing firm The Bodley Head).

Awards and recognition
RAMM was named the United Kingdom's "Museum of the Year" by The Art Fund charity in 2012, citing its "ambition and imagination".

Since reopening, RAMM has won over a dozen other awards, including three regional RIBA (Royal Institute of British Architects) awards (2013); the Collections Trust award recognising the curatorial and collections management good practice of RAMM (2013); and the American Event Design Award for Best Museum Environment (2012).

Veitch Memorial Lecture
At the end of every July, the Royal Albert Memorial Museum holds a plant-orientated lecture in memory of Sir Harry Veitch.

Funding
RAMM is owned and partly funded by Exeter City Council, with additional funding from Arts Council England's National Portfolio Organisation programme of investment in the arts.  Significant development funding was received from the Heritage Lottery Fund in 2007–11.

Notable artworks in the RAMM Collection

References

External links
 Official website
Virtual tour of the Royal Albert Memorial Museum provided by Google Arts & Culture

Museums in Exeter
Art museums and galleries in Devon
Natural history museums in England
Gothic Revival architecture in Devon
Monuments and memorials to Albert, Prince Consort
Monuments and memorials in Devon
Musical instrument museums
Museums established in 1868
1868 establishments in England
University of Exeter